Unplugged: Live from Sugarhill Studios is the third EP by American rock band Lynch Mob, and the first record the band performed acoustic versions of their songs. Drummer Scot Coogan left the band and Brian Tichy (ex-Whitesnake) replaced him, but for the EP he plays guitars.

Track list

Personnel 
Oni Logan – vocals
George Lynch – acoustic guitar, backing vocals
Robbie Crane – acoustic bass guitar, backing vocals
Brian Tichy – acoustic guitar, backing vocals

Additional personnel
Tyson Sheth – percussion

References 

Lynch Mob (band) albums
2013 EPs